Stryphnodes is a moth genus, belonging to the family Tineidae. It contains only one species, Stryphnodes styracopa, which is found in Sri Lanka.

References

Tineidae
Monotypic moth genera
Moths of Asia
Tineidae genera
Taxa named by Edward Meyrick